"The Blue Film" (1954) is a short story by the English novelist Graham Greene. The story is set in Thailand.

It was adapted for television as part of the 1970s series Shades of Greene, and starred Betsy Blair, Baron Casanov, Koo Stark, and Brian Cox.

References 

1954 short stories
Short stories by Graham Greene